The women's 48 kilograms (extra lightweight) competition at the 2006 Asian Games in Doha was held on 5 December at the Qatar SC Indoor Hall.

Schedule
All times are Arabia Standard Time (UTC+03:00)

Results

Main bracket

Repechage

References

Results

External links
 
 Official website

W48
Judo at the Asian Games Women's Extra Lightweight
Asian W48